Tazehabad is a city in Kermanshah Province, Iran.

Tazehabad, some times rendered as Tazekhabad, may also refer to:

Ardabil Province
Tazehabad, Bileh Savar, a village in Bileh Savar County
Tazehabad, Parsabad, a village in Parsabad County

Gilan Province
Tazehabad-e Chomaqestan, a village in Amlash County
Tazehabad-e Narakeh, a village in Amlash County
Tazehabad-e Fushazdeh, a village in Astaneh-ye Ashrafiyeh County
Tazehabad-e Marzian, a village in Astaneh-ye Ashrafiyeh County
Tazehabad-e Kalashem, a village in Fuman County
Tazehabad, Langarud, a village in Langarud County
Tazehabad, Otaqvar, a village in Langarud County
Tazehabad-e Chaf, a village in Langarud County
Tazehabad-e Kord Sara Kuh, a village in Langarud County
Tazehabad, Khoshk-e Bijar, a village in Rasht County
Tazehabad, Lasht-e Nesha, a village in Rasht County
Tazehabad (37°13′ N 49°30′ E), Pasikhan, a village in Rasht County
Tazehabad (34°14′ N 48°28′ E), Pasikhan, a village in Rasht County
Tazehabad-e Khachekin, a village in Rasht County
Tazehabad-e Sadar, a village in Rasht County
Tazehabad, Rezvanshahr, a village in Rezvanshahr County
Tazehabad, Kelachay, a village in Rudsar County
Tazehabad, Rahimabad, a village in Rudsar County
Tazehabad-e Pasikhan, a village in Shaft County
Tazehabad, Siahkal, a village in Siahkal County
Tazehabad, Talesh, a village in Talesh County

Golestan Province
Tazehabad, Golestan, a village in Aqqala County

Ilam Province
Tazehabad, Ilam, a village in Shirvan and Chardaval County

Kermanshah Province

Dalahu County
Tazehabad, alternate name of Baba Kuseh-ye Olya, a village in Dalahu County
Tazehabad-e Mowlai, a village in Dalahu County

Eslamabad-e Gharb County
Tazehabad, Eslamabad-e Gharb, a village in Eslamabad-e Gharb County
Tazehabad-e Darreh Gerd, a village in Eslamabad-e Gharb County
Tazehabad-e Kukav, a village in Eslamabad-e Gharb County
Tazehabad-e Taleqan, a village in Eslamabad-e Gharb County

Gilan-e Gharb County
Tazehabad-e Bati, a village in Gilan-e Gharb County
Tazehabad-e Heydarbeygi, a village in Gilan-e Gharb County
Tazehabad-e Seydali, a village in Gilan-e Gharb County

Harsin County
Tazehabad-e Nazliyan, a village in Harsin County

Javanrud County
Tazehabad-e Bani Azizi, a village in Javanrud County
Tazehabad-e Labagh, a village in Javanrud County
Tazehabad-e Miraki, a village in Javanrud County

Kermanshah County
Tazehabad, Kuzaran, a village in Kermanshah County
Tazehabad-e Amaleh, a village in Kermanshah County
Tazehabad-e Bidgoli, a village in Kermanshah County
Tazehabad-e Murchi, a village in Kermanshah County
Tazehabad-e Namivand, a village in Kermanshah County
Tazehabad-e Rika, a village in Kermanshah County
Tazehabad-e Sarab Tiran, a village in Kermanshah County
Tazehabad-e Sarayilan, a village in Kermanshah County

Paveh County
Tazehabad-e Markazi, a village in Paveh County

Qasr-e Shirin County
Tazehabad-e Garaveh, a village in Qasr-e Shirin County
Tazehabad-e Shir Ali, a village in Qasr-e Shirin County

Ravansar County
Tazehabad-e Banchia, a village in Ravansar County
Tazehabad-e Melleh Tarshi, a village in Ravansar County
Tazehabad-e Serias, a village in Ravansar County

Sahneh County
Tazehabad, Sahneh, a village in Sahneh County

Salas-e Babajani County
Tazehabad, a city in Salas-e Babajani County
Tazehabad-e Amin, Kermanshah, a village in Salas-e Babajani County
Tazehabad-e Gardel Gari, a village in Salas-e Babajani County
Tazehabad-e Gari Khan Mohammad, a village in Salas-e Babajani County

Sarpol-e Zahab County
Tazehabad-e Ahmadi, a village in Sarpol-e Zahab County
Tazehabad-e Kowliha, a village in Sarpol-e Zahab County

Sonqor County
Tazehabad-e Karsavan, a village in Sonqor County
Tazehabad-e Sarab, a village in Sonqor County

Kurdistan Province

Bijar County
Tazehabad, Bijar, a village in Bijar County

Dehgolan County
Tazehabad, Dehgolan, a village in Dehgolan County
Tazehabad, Bolbanabad, a village in Dehgolan County
Tazehabad-e Gavmishan, a village in Dehgolan County
Tazehabad-e Qeruchay, a village in Dehgolan County
Tazehabad-e Tahmasbqoli, a village in Dehgolan County
Tazehabad, alternate name of Naserabad, Kurdistan, a village in Dehgolan County

Divandarreh County
Tazehabad-e Amin, Kurdistan, a village in Divandarreh County
Tazehabad-e Asef, a village in Divandarreh County
Tazehabad-e Bozon Qaran, a village in Divandarreh County
Tazehabad Duleh Rash, a village in Divandarreh County
Tazehabad-e Galaneh, a village in Divandarreh County
Tazehabad-e Hijan, a village in Divandarreh County
Tazehabad-e Maran, a village in Divandarreh County
Tazehabad-e Qazi Ali, a village in Divandarreh County
Tazehabad-e Sar Dalan, a village in Divandarreh County
Tazehabad-e Vazir, a village in Divandarreh County

Kamyaran County
Tazehabad-e Dulkoru, a village in Kamyaran County
Tazehabad-e Gerger, a village in Kamyaran County

Marivan County
Tazehabad, Marivan, a village in Marivan County
Tazehabad, Sarshiv, a village in Marivan County

Qorveh County
Tazehabad-e Dizaj, a village in Qorveh County
Tazehabad-e Jameh Shuran, a village in Qorveh County
Tazehabad-e Karimabad, a village in Qorveh County
Tazehabad-e Sar Owriyeh, a village in Qorveh County
Tazehabad-e Sarab-e Qaht, a village in Qorveh County

Sanandaj County
Tazehabad-e Doktor Vase, a village in Sanandaj County
Tazehabad-e Doveyseh, a village in Sanandaj County
Tazehabad-e Isaabad, a village in Sanandaj County
Tazehabad Kikhosrow, a village in Sanandaj County
Tazehabad-e Qaleh Juq, a village in Sanandaj County
Tazehabad-e Qaragol, a village in Sanandaj County

Saqqez County
Tazehabad, Saqqez, a village in Saqqez County

Sarvabad County
Tazehabad, Sarvabad, a village in Sarvabad County

Lorestan Province
Tazehabad, Delfan, a village in Delfan County
Tazehabad, Dowreh, a village in Dowreh County
Tazehabad, Kuhdasht, a village in Kuhdasht County
Tazehabad Bahram, a village in Delfan County
Tazehabad Golestaneh, a village in Delfan County

Mazandaran Province
Tazehabad, Abbasabad, a village in Abbasabad County
Tazehabad, Amol, a village in Amol County
Tazehabad, Dabudasht, a village in Amol County
Tazehabad, Babolsar, a village in Babolsar County
Tazehabad, Behshahr, a village in Behshahr County
Tazehabad, Chalus, a village in Chalus County
Tazehabad, Mahmudabad, a village in Mahmudabad County
Tazehabad-e Bostan Kheyl, a village in Neka County
Tazehabad Kola, a village in Neka County
Tazehabad, Nowshahr, a village in Nowshahr County
Tazehabad, Sari, a village in Sari County
Tazehabad-e Jehad, a village in Sari County
Tazehabad-e Sepah, a village in Sari County
Tazehabad, Tonekabon, a village in Tonekabon County

Qazvin Province
Tazehabad, Qazvin, a village in Abyek County

West Azerbaijan Province
Tazehabad, West Azerbaijan, a village in Shahin Dezh County